

Buildings and structures

Buildings

 1580 – Old City of Zamość, designed by Bernardo Morando, is established in Poland.
 1580–1588 – Wollaton Hall near Nottingham in England, probably designed by Robert Smythson, is built.
 1581
 Uffizi in Florence, designed by Giorgio Vasari and continued by Alfonso Parigi the Elder and Bernardo Buontalenti, is completed.
 Litomyšl Castle in Bohemia, begun in 1568, is completed.
 c. 1582 – Dome and lantern of the church of Santa Maria di Loreto, Rome, completed by Giacomo del Duca.
 1583
 Allahabad Fort, built by Emperor Akbar, is completed.
 Quirinal Palace in Rome, designed by Carlo Maderno and Domenico Fontana, is begun.
 New Basilica of Our Lady of Humility, Pistoia, Tuscany, is consecrated.

 1584
 El Escorial palace at San Lorenzo de El Escorial, Spain (begun 1563), designed by Juan de Herrera, is completed.
 Church of the Gesù in Rome, designed by Giacomo Barozzi da Vignola in 1568 and completed by Giacomo della Porta with "the first truly baroque façade", is consecrated.
 1585 – Teatro Olimpico, Vicenza, designed by Palladio, and completed by Vincenzo Scamozzi, is opened.
 1585 – Neubau in Strasbourg, begun in 1582, is inaugurated.
 1586 – Golden Tea Room first recorded in use in Japan.
 1587–1588 – Fort Al Jalali at Muscat, Oman, is built by Portuguese naval captain Belchior Calaça.
 1588
 Court theatre at Sabbioneta, designed by Vincenzo Scamozzi, is begun (completed 1590.)
 Roselius-Haus in Bremen is completed.
 Villa Barbarigo, Noventa Vicentina is commissioned.

Publications
 1584 – Gian Paolo Lomazzo produces his treatise Trattato dell'arte della pittura, scoltura et architettura.

Births
 1585 – Pietro Paolo Floriani, Italian architect and engineer (died 1638)
 1586–1587 – Nicholas Stone, English sculptor and architect (died 1647)
 1587
 Fabio Mangone, Italian architect (died 1629)
 Hans van Steenwinckel the Younger, Flemish/Danish architect (died 1639)

Deaths

 1580: August 19 – Andrea Palladio, Italian architect (born 1508)
 1583: October 30 – Pirro Ligorio, Italian architect, painter, antiquarian and garden designer (born 1510)
 1588: July 17 – Mimar Sinan, Ottoman architect (born 1489)

References

 
Architecture